Calosoma peruviense is a species of ground beetle in the subfamily of Carabinae. It was described by Mandl in 1917.

References

peruviense
Beetles described in 1917